Satyavan Savitri (Marathi: सत्यवान सावित्री) is a 1914 Indian silent film, directed and produced by Indian icon Dadasaheb Phalke. It was the second feature film created by Dadasaheb Phalke.

Overview
The film is based on the 'Savitri and Satyavan' story appearing in the 'Book of Forest' of the Mahabharat.
This movie was also referenced in the movie Harishchandrachi Factory. A scene portraying the advertising campaign for this film is shown
Rajkumar Chaudhary

References

1914 films
Indian silent films
Lost Indian films
Films about Savitri and Satyavan
Indian black-and-white films
1914 lost films